White Oak Run (also known as White Oak Run No. 1) is a tributary of the Lackawanna River in Lackawanna County, Pennsylvania, in the United States. The stream is impacted by various types of debris, localized iron hydroxide deposits, stormwater, and combined sewer overflows. However, its middle and upper reaches are largely undisturbed. The White Oak Ravines are in the stream's watershed.

A number of mine openings historically existed along White Oak Run. A bridge was also constructed across the stream in 1908. White Oak Run is designated as a Coldwater Fishery and a Migratory Fishery. It has a stable riparian buffer in many of its reaches. Plants in the buffer include hemlocks and rhododendrons.

Course
White Oak Run begins on a mountain in Jefferson Township. It flows southwest for a few tenths of a mile before turning west-southwest for a few tenths of a mile. The stream then turns west-northwest for several tenths of a mile and enters Archbald. It then turns southwest and enters a narrow, shallow valley as it continues flowing down the mountain. After a short distance, the stream west-northwest for several tenths of a mile before receiving Indian Cave Creek, its only named tributary, from the right. The stream then flows west for several tenths of a mile, passing through the White Oak Reservoir and crossing US Route 6. Several tenths of a mile downstream of US Route 6, it arrives at the bottom of the mountain and reaches its confluence with the Lackawanna River.

White Oak Run joins the Lackawanna River  upriver of its mouth.

Tributaries
White Oak Run has one officially named tributary, which is known as Indian Cave Creek. White Oak Run also has a number of unnamed tributaries.

Hydrology
Some small mine seeps contribute iron hydroxide to White Oak Run. However, their effects are localized. Urban debris, construction debris, and other litter occur in the stream's channel in its lower reaches. Additionally, combined sewer overflows and stormwater discharge into the stream near its mouth.

In the early 1900s, White Oak Run was clear as far downstream as one of its tributaries. However, flow from a slush bank owned by the Archbald Coal Company turned the stream black below the confluence. The stream was black from that point downstream to its mouth and had culm deposits on its streambanks and in its streambed.

Geography and geology

A morphologic feature known as the White Oak Ravines is in the watershed of White Oak Run. The headwaters of the stream are in the Moosic Mountains.

The lower reaches of White Oak Run are impacted by urban development and historical mining. However, the middle and upper reaches of the stream are relatively undisturbed. The Lackawanna River Watershed Conservation Plan describes its upper reaches as "pristine" and the reach downstream of Indian Cave Creek as "very scenic".

White Oak Run begins to experience disturbances from past mining activity a short distance upstream of the Robert Casey Highway. Overburden piles have altered its course and small mine seeps discharge into it. In its last , the stream flows through a steep ravine with rock ledges and some coal seams. The substrate in this reach consists of bedrock, large boulders, and rock ledges.

The final  of White Oak Run is channelized with concrete and rock walls.

Watershed
The mouth of the stream is in the United States Geological Survey quadrangle of Olyphant. However, its source is in the quadrangle of Lake Ariel.

White Oak Run is a second-order stream. It is one of the larger tributaries of the Lackawanna River. Pennsylvania State Game Lands are in the watershed's upper reaches. White Oak Run is impounded by a dam known as the White Oak Dam. The Archbald Borough Building is located at the mouth of the creek.

White Oak Run is a source of flooding in the borough of Archbald. Property owners along the stream have been known to experience basement flooding.

History
White Oak Run was entered into the Geographic Names Information System on August 2, 1979. Its identifier in the Geographic Names Information System is 1199784.

The Archbald Coal Company Breaker was historically in the watershed of White Oak Run. Additionally, a number of mine openings were constructed along the stream by the Evans and Owens brothers. A concrete slab bridge carrying Goers Hill Road over White Oak Run was built in 1908.

In the early 2000s, the Lackawanna River Watershed Conservation Plan recommended long-term management of the area in the vicinity of White Oak Run solely for conservation use. The conservation plan also recommended that Archbald and Jefferson Township include protection of the stream in their zoning plans, comprehensive plans, and other plans. Two reaches of the stream are on the List of Special Places and Natural Areas of the Lackawanna River Conservation Association. The stream is on the Watershed Restoration Priority List (for the Lackawanna River basin) of the Pennsylvania Department of Environmental Protection's Bureau of Abandoned Mine Reclamation.

On July 18, 2011, White Stone Quarry, LLC received a permit to discharge stormwater into White Oak Run.

Biology
White Oak Run is designated as a Coldwater Fishery and a Migratory Fishery.

In its upper reaches, White Oak Run has a stable cover consisting of native forest and understory plants. Downstream of the tributary Indian Cave Creek, the stream has a riparian buffer consisting of hemlock and rhododendron. In its lower reaches, it also has a substantial riparian buffer, including some mature trees in the channel itself.

See also
 Laurel Run (Lackawanna River), next tributary of the Lackawanna River going downriver
 Aylesworth Creek, next tributary of the Lackawanna River going upriver
 List of rivers of Pennsylvania
 List of tributaries of the Lackawanna River

References

Rivers of Lackawanna County, Pennsylvania
Tributaries of the Lackawanna River
Rivers of Pennsylvania